Mr. Redmont Club Bulukumba (simply known as MRC Bulukumba) is an Indonesian football club based in Bulukumba Regency, South Sulawesi. They currently compete in the Liga 3.

History
This club is owned by the cafe company Mr. Redmont Cafe and is managed by Arum Spink, a prominent politician and legislator of the Regional Representative Council (DPRD) of South Sulawesi. This team was established in August 2021 and has been registered as a member of the Provincial Association of South Sulawesi PSSI (In Indonesian: Asprov PSSI Sulawesi Selatan). At the beginning of the club's formation, they had participated in the pre-season 2021 South Sulawesi Governor's Cup and are currently making their debut competing in Liga 3 South Sulawesi zone.

Honours
 South Sulawesi Governor's Cup
 First Round / Top 12: 2021
  2021 Football Exhibition Bulukumba Local Competition
 Runner-up: 2021

References

External links
 MRC Bulukumba on Instagram

Bulukumba Regency
Football clubs in Indonesia
Football clubs in South Sulawesi
Association football clubs established in 2021
2021 establishments in Indonesia